Here is a list of monorails in Japan.

Currently operational
Tokyo Monorail: Tokyo, 1964. One of the world's most commercially successful monorail lines, carrying around 100 million passengers yearly.
Tama Toshi Monorail Line: Tokyo, 1998.
Toei Ueno Zoo Monorail: Tokyo, 1958. It links the two sectors of the zoo in Ueno Park. Service has been suspended since 31 October 2019.
Disney Resort Line: Urayasu, Chiba, 2001.
Chiba Urban Monorail (Townliner): Chiba, Chiba, 1988. (suspended monorail)
Osaka Monorail: Osaka, 1990. Second longest monorail line in the world.
Shōnan Monorail: Kanagawa, 1970. (suspended monorail)
Skyrail Midorizaka Line: Aki-ku, Hiroshima, Hiroshima, 1998. (suspended monorail) A commuter line in a residential development suburb of the city. It is also considered as an automated guideway transit.
Kitakyūshū Monorail: Kitakyūshū, Fukuoka, 1985.
Okinawa Urban Monorail (Yui Rail): Okinawa, 2003.

Discontinued
Nagoya Municipal Nagoya City Higashiyama Park Monorail Line Monorail, Nagoya, Aichi, 1964 — 1974.
Himeji City Monorail Line, Himeji, Hyōgo, 1965 — 1974.
Meitetsu Monkey Park Monorail Line: Inuyama, Aichi, 1962–2008. It linked the Monkey Park to the nearest railway station.
Nara Dreamland Monorail, Nara Dreamland, 1961 — 2006
Odakyū Mukōgaoka-Yūen Monorail Line, Kawasaki, Kanagawa, 1965 — 2001.
"Suspended Train" at the Exhibition of Transportation and Electricity in Osaka, 1928. Operated only for a week, from November 28 until December 3. It was the first monorail in the nation, as well as the only one in the pre-war period.
Yokohama Dreamland Monorail, Kanagawa, 1966 — 1967.
Yomiuriland Monorail, Kanagawa and Tokyo, 1964 — 1978.

Other monorails
Slope cars are small automated monorails found in the various parts of Japan. Unlike the monorails above, slope cars are not legally considered as railways. Similar concepts include Raxcars and Monoriders.
There are also small industrial monorails used in various places, most notably in steep orchards, especially of mikan citrus.  The first of its kind was invented in 1966.
Vista liner is another type of monorail which is not legally a railway. The system is smaller than ordinary monorails, but larger than slope cars. Vista liners can be typically seen in amusement parks, such as Expo Land.

Automated guideway transits
Strictly speaking, these lines are not monorails, though they resemble one at first glance. The rail in the center of the track serve only to guide the train, not support it, so they don't qualify as monorails.
 Astram Line (Hiroshima Rapid Transit Hiroshima New Transit Line 1): Hiroshima, Hiroshima
 Linimo (Aichi Rapid Transit Tōbu Kyūryō Line): Aichi.
 Nagoya Guideway Bus Shidami Line (Yutorīto Line): Nagoya, Aichi.
 New Shuttle (Saitama New Urban Transit Ina Line): Saitama, Saitama.
 New Tram (Osaka Municipal Nankō Port Town Line): Osaka, Osaka.
 Peach Liner (Tōkadai New Transit Tōkadai Line): Komaki, Aichi. Already discontinued.
 Port Liner (Kobe New Transit Port Island Line): Kobe, Hyōgo.
 Rokkō Liner (Kobe New Transit Rokkō Island Line): Kobe, Hyōgo.
 Seaside Line (Yokohama New Transit Kanazawa Seaside Line): Yokohama, Kanagawa.
 Seibu Yamaguchi Line (Leo Liner): Tokorozawa, Saitama. A people mover Between Seibuen Park and Invoice Seibu Dome.
 Toei Nippori-Toneri Liner: Tokyo.
 Yamaman Yūkarigaoka Line: Sakura, Chiba.
 Yurikamome (Tokyo Waterfront New Transit Waterfront Line): Tokyo.

Photo gallery

See also 
Monorail
List of railway companies in Japan
List of railway lines in Japan
Slope car